Turun Palloseura Naiset or TPS Naiset are an ice hockey team in the Finnish Naisten Liiga. They are the representative women's ice hockey team of Turun Palloseura (TPS), a multi-sport club based in Turku, Southwest Finland and they play at the Kupittaan jäähalli and the Impivaara Ice Rink. The team has played in the Naisten Liiga, Finland’s premier women's ice hockey league, since gaining promotion in the 2018–19 season.

TPS Akatemia, the team’s junior affiliate, is active in the Finnish lower level leagues, the Naisten Mestis and Naisten Suomi-sarja.

Season-by-season results 
This is a partial list of the most recent seasons completed by TPS Naiset. Note: Finish = Rank at end of regular season; GP = Games played, W = Wins (3 points), OTW = Overtime wins (2 points), OTL = Overtime losses (1 point), L = Losses, GF = Goals for, GA = Goals against, Pts = Points, Top scorer: Points (Goals+Assists); Mestis Q = Mestis qualifiers

Players and personnel

2022–23 roster 

Coaching staff and team personnel
 Head coach: Terhi Mertanen
 Assistant coach: Rami Laiho
 Assistant coach: Kari Nummelin
 Assistant coach: Tom Seipell
 Goaltending coach: Tapani Härkönen
 Goaltending coach: Isabella Laiho
 Conditioning coach: Tom Seipell
 Team managers: Hanna Karelius & Jaana Rantala
 Physical therapist: Suvi Mäntyniemi
 Equipment managers: Benny Karlsson, Janne Sirén & Hans Stenlund

Team captaincy history 
 Hanna Karelius, 2002–2004
 Noora Sirvö, 2014–15
 Jenni Jokinen, 2015–16
 Casandra Roine, 2016–2018
 Juulia Salonen, 2018–19
 Minni Lehtopelto, 2019–20
 Elina Heikkinen, 2020–

Head coaches 
 Jorma Valtonen, 2002–2004
 Mika Järvinen, 2004–05
 Timo Tuomi, 2014–2016
 Hanna Karelius, 2016–2018
 Matti Tähkäpää, 2019–11 February 2021
 Kai Ortio, 11 February 2021–March 2021
 Terhi Mertanen, 2021–

Notable alumni 
Years active with TPS listed alongside players' names.
 Amel Gaily, 2009–2013
 Heidi Holmevaara, 2005–2010
 Marika Jestoi, 1991–1996
 Hanna Karelius, 1999–2006 & 2012–2014
 Maija Otamo, 2017–2022
 Olka Penttilä, 2010–2012
 Titta Ruohonen, 1999–2000, 2002–2008 & 2013–2015
 Mia Sakström, 1999–2005
 Noora Sirviö, 2007–08 & 2010–2015
 Susanna Tapani, 2018–19
 Nina Tikkinen, 2001–2005

International players 

 Carlotta Clodi, 2019–20
 Estelle Duvin, 2020–2022
 Lara Escudero, 2020–21
 Kinga Horváthová, 2020–21
 Monika Janis, 2007–2010 & 2011–12
 Carlotta Regine, 2019–20
 Katie Robinson, 2020–21
 Lenka Serdar, 2020–21

References

External links 
Official team website 
 Team information and statistics from Eliteprospects.com and Eurohockey.com and Hockeyarchives.info 

Naisten Liiga (ice hockey) teams
Turun Palloseura
Ice hockey teams in Finland
Women's ice hockey teams in Europe
1990 establishments in Finland